Tazehabad-e Sarayilan (also Romanized as Tāzehābād-e Sarāyīlān; also known as Tāzehābād) is a village in Jalalvand Rural District, Firuzabad District, Kermanshah County, Kermanshah Province, Iran. At the 2006 census, its population was 88, in 20 families.

References 

Populated places in Kermanshah County